This is a list of Austrian Righteous Among the Nations. , 109 Austrians have been honored with this title by Yad Vashem for saving Jews during World War II.

List

 Beran, Christa
Boehm, Maria
Bosko, Oswald
Bottesi, Wanda
Buchegger, Friederike
Dietz, Anton
Duschka, Reinhold
Ehn, Anna
Friessnegg, Anna and Ludwig
Fritz, Charlotte
Gröger, Karl B.
Haas, Anna-Maria
Harand, Irene
Hauer, Edith (Frischmuth)
Kleisinger, Dr. Ewald and Danuta
Knapp, Ludwig and Maria
Kuttelwascher, Otto and Mina
Lanc, Dr. Artur and Maria
Langbein, Hermann
Legath, Gisela; children Frieda and Martin
Leitner, Franz
Lutz, Erwin
Madritsch, Julius
Motesicky, Baron Karl
Neff, Dorothea
 Pollreis, Luci
Pscheidt, Johann
Reinhard, Kurt
 Riss, Hermine
Schauer, Maria
Schmid, Anton
Semrad, Ludwig
Stecher, Edi
Steiner, Maria
Stocker, Maria
Tschögl, Florian
Tschoell, Dr. Leo
Wertz, Dr. Rudolf

References 

 
Righteous Among the Nations
Austrian